Nafi Tuitavake (born 21 January 1989) is a New Zealand Rugby union player who plays for the Vodacom Blue Bulls in the Super rugby competition. He is the younger brother of former All Black winger Anthony Tuitavake.

He was named in the Crusaders five-man wider training group for 2014.

On 21 September 2016, Nafi sign professional contract with English club Northampton Saints in the Aviva Premiership from the 2016–17 season.

Tuitavake made some good appearances in Saints' second side the Northampton Wanderers, before being drafted into the first team as the wider squad suffered with injuries. The Tonga centre thrived and secured a place in the first team quickly and most recently helped his side secure European Champions Cup rugby for the 2017/18 season as the side beat Stade Francais by just one point.

Tuitavake will travel with Tonga for their 2017 summer internationals, battling with fellow Pacific Island nations, and Saints teammates, for a Rugby World Cup qualification for the 2019 competition. At the end of the 2018/19 season, Tuitivake was released by the Northampton Saints.

He gained selection to the 2019 Rugby World Cup in Japan and made just one appearance, against England, before being sent home with a fractured arm.

Career highlights

North Harbour ITM CUP 2010
New Zealand U20 2009
New Zealand Sevens 2008
North Harbour U21 2007
North Harbour U19 2006
North Harbour U16 2005

References

New Zealand sportspeople of Tongan descent
New Zealand rugby union players
North Harbour rugby union players
SU Agen Lot-et-Garonne players
Crusaders (rugby union) players
1989 births
Living people
People educated at Massey High School
Rugby union players from Auckland
Rugby union wings
Expatriate rugby union players in France
New Zealand expatriates in France
New Zealand international rugby sevens players
Tonga international rugby union players
Northampton Saints players
Bulls (rugby union) players
RC Narbonne players